The 1944 Fairfield-Suisun Army Air Base Skymasters football team was an American football team that represented the Air Transport Command at Suisun-Fairfield Air Base (now Travis Air Force Base) during the 1944 college football season. The team compiled a 1–7 record. John Giannoni, who played in the NFL for the Cleveland Rams in 1938, was the team's coach and also played for the team.

Schedule

References

Fairfield-Suisun Army Air Base
Fairfield-Suisun Army Air Base